There Must Be a Pony is a 1986 American made-for-television drama film directed by Joseph Sargent. It is based on the novel of the same name by James Kirkwood Jr.

Premise
Marguerite Sydney is a celebrated Hollywood star attempting a comeback after a stay in a mental hospital, as well as trying to re-establish a relationship with her teenage son, and risking a romance with a mysterious new suitor.

Cast
 Elizabeth Taylor as Marguerite Sydney
 Robert Wagner as Ben Nichols
 James Coco as Mervin Trellis
 William Windom as Lee Hertzig
 Edward Winter as David Hollis
 Ken Olin as Jay Savage
 Dick O'Neill as Chief Investigator Roy Clymer
 Chad Lowe as Josh Sydney

Reception
"Miss Taylor and Mr. Lowe are worth the effort of watching but, in the end, the movie illustrates one of Marguerite's pearls of wisdom: 'Talk about grinding it out. TV brings new meaning to the words chopped liver," said The New York Times. People advised, "Think of this as a one-woman show, Elizabeth Taylor’s show, and you’ll be in for some moments to remember... If you own a VCR, tape this show, then speed through it, stopping only to savor Liz’s scenes. Then erase the tape."

Awards
The film was nominated for the Primetime Emmy Award for Outstanding Art Direction for a Miniseries or Movie in 1987.

Links

References

1986 television films
1986 films
1986 drama films
Films directed by Joseph Sargent
Films scored by Billy Goldenberg
American drama television films
1980s English-language films
1980s American films